Abigail Roache is a New Zealand rugby league and union player. She represented New Zealand at the delayed 2021 Women's Rugby League World Cup in England. She plays for the Richmond Roses in the ARL. In rugby union, she plays for the Chiefs Manawa in the Super Rugby Aupiki competition and for the Auckland Storm provincially.

Rugby career

Rugby league 
Roache is the younger sister of NRL player, Nathaniel Roache. She tore her ACL in both knees before turning 20 and had further surgery to repair meniscus injuries.

Roache was awarded the Cathy Friend Women's Player of the Year in 2022 for her outstanding performance for the Richmond Roses in the Auckland Rugby League competition.

Roache was initially left out of the Kiwi Ferns squad for the delayed 2021 Rugby League World Cup, but received a late call-up when Kararaina Wira-Kohu withdrew due to a torn calf days before the tournament. She made her Kiwi Ferns test debut on 10 November 2022 in their pool game loss to the Jillaroos at the World Cup. She also featured in her sides 20–6 semi-final victory over England. She started in the final, where the Kiwi Ferns lost 54–4 to the Jillaroos.

The 22-year-old

Rugby union 
Roache was named in Auckland Storm's squad for the 2019 Farah Palmer Cup season. She joined Chiefs Manawa for the 2023 Super Rugby Aupiki season.

References

External links 

 NRL Profile
 NZRL Profile
 Chiefs Manawa Profile

Living people
2000 births
New Zealand female rugby league players
New Zealand women's national rugby league team players
Rugby league five-eighths
Rugby league centres
New Zealand female rugby union players